Sir George Hamilton, Comte d'Hamilton (died 1676) was an Irish soldier in English and French service as well as a courtier at Charles II's Whitehall.

At Whitehall he was a favourite of the King. He courted La belle Stuart and married Frances Jennings, the future Lady Tyrconnell, who was then a maid of honour of the Duchess of York. He appears in the Mémoires du comte de Grammont, written by his brother Anthony.

He began his military career as an officer in the Life Guards but was dismissed in an anti-Catholic purge in 1667, upon which he took French service and commanded English gens d'armes and then an Irish regiment in the Franco-Dutch War (1672–1678). He served under Turenne at the battles of Sinsheim and Entzheim in 1674. He also fought at Sasbach (1675) where Turenne was killed. He then covered the retreat at Altenheim. He was killed in 1676 in a rearguard action at the Col de Saverne while serving under Marshal Luxembourg. His final rank was Maréchal de camp (major-general). He was known as "comte", but whether he was really ennobled by Louis XIV is not sure.

Birth and origins 
George was probably born in the late 1630s. His place of birth is probably Nenagh, County Tipperary, but it was long believed that it was Roscrea, County Tipperary. He was the second son of George Hamilton and his wife Mary Butler. His father was Scottish, the fourth son of James Hamilton, 1st Earl of Abercorn, and would in 1660 be created Baronet of Donalong and Nenagh. The Dunnalong (or Donalong) estate, south of Derry, was his father's share of the land granted to his grandfather Abercorn during the Plantation of Ulster.

George's mother was Irish, the third daughter of Thomas Butler, Viscount Thurles and a sister of the future 1st Duke of Ormond (see Family Tree). She was a member of the Butler dynasty, an Old English family that descended from Theobald Walter, who had been appointed Chief Butler of Ireland by King Henry II in 1177.

His parents have often been confused with another George Hamilton, married with another Mary Butler. These are his father's uncle Sir George Hamilton of Greenlaw and Roscrea and his wife Mary, sixth daughter of Walter Butler, 11th Earl of Ormond. This other George Hamilton lived in Roscrea.

George had five brothers and three sisters, who are listed in his father's article.

Both his parents were Catholic, but some relatives, on his father's as on his mother's side, were Protestants. His grandfather, James Hamilton, 1st Earl of Abercorn, had been a Protestant, but his father and all his paternal uncles were raised as Catholics due to the influence of his paternal grandmother, Marion Boyd, a recusant. Some branches of the Hamilton family were Protestant, such as that of his father's second cousin Gustavus (1642–1723). His mother's family, the Butlers, were generally Catholic with the notable exception of the future 1st Duke of Ormond, his maternal uncle. His eldest brother, James, would turn Protestant when marrying Elizabeth Colepeper in 1661. His brother Thomas also conformed to the established religion as he became a captain in the Royal Navy.

Early life

Irish wars 
Hamilton's father, Sir George Hamilton, Baronet, served in the Irish army and fought for the government under his uncle Ormond in the Irish Confederate Wars (1641–1648) and the Cromwellian conquest of Ireland (1649–1653) until he followed Ormond into exile in 1651.

During that time young Hamilton stayed with his mother and siblings at Nenagh Castle, deep in confederate territory. The family was Catholic and well accepted despite his father's alliance to Ormond. Similarly, Ormond's wife and children lived in Kilkenny Castle through most of the Confederate wars. In both cases they were probably under the protection of Richard Butler, 3rd Viscount Mountgarret, the president of the Confederation. Mountgarret was his mother's grand-uncle through his sister Helen.

In June 1646 Owen Roe O'Neill at the head of the Confederate Ulster army defeated the Scottish Covenanters at Benburb. He then swept south as directed by Rinuccini to attack the royalists. He passed by Roscrea and took Roscrea Castle on 17 September 1646. He put everybody to the sword but spared Lady Hamilton and her family. It has ben interpreted that this was Lady Mary Hamilton, wife of Sir George Hamilton, Baronet, Hamilton's mother, but it is likely that she was Mary Hamilton, wife of Sir George Hamilton of Greenlaw and Roscrea and that Lady Hamilton-Donalong was at that time with her children safely at Nenagh, further to the southwest out of O'Neills way.

In 1648 Phelim O'Neill attacked and took Nenagh Castle, but it was retaken that same year by Inchiquin.

First exile 
In spring 1651, Sir George Hamilton, Baronet, and his family followed Ormond into French exile. They first went to Caen where they were accommodated for some time by the Marchioness of Ormond. They then moved on to Paris near where Charles II and his mother Henrietta Maria lived in exile at the Chateau-Neuf de Saint-Germain-en-Laye. Young Hamilton, aged about 15, became a page to the King. His father was employed in various missions for Ormond and the King, whereas his mother found shelter in the convent of the Feuillantines in Paris, together with her sister Ellen, Lady Muskerry. France was at that time fighting the long Franco-Spanish War (1635–1659). In 1654 France gained Cromwell as an ally against Spain resulting in the Anglo-Spanish War (1654–1660), and in consequence the King had to leave France. He moved his court first to Cologne, then in March 1656 to Brussels where on 2 April 1656, Ormond and Rochester signed in Charles's name the Treaty of Brussels with Spain. On 22 April Charles was moved to Bruges. On 14 June 1658 Charles' brother James led the royalists in the Battle of the Dunes and was defeated by Turenne. The King then moved to Antwerp. On 3 September 1658 Cromwell died. On 7 February 1658 the King was allowed back to Brussels.

Restoration 
At the Restoration, Hamilton was accepted into the Life Guards that Charles II and the Duke of York established early in 1660 in preparation of their return to London. Hamilton served in the King's troop, which was commanded by Charles Gerard as captain and colonel. Hamilton was an officer rather than a private.

After the King's return to London in May 1660, Hamilton attended the court at Whitehall in addition to his military duties. He, like his brothers James and Anthony, and his sister Elizabeth, were part of to the inner circle around the King. Samuel Pepys reports that Hamilton was present at the Queen's Birthday dance on 15 October 1666 at Whitehall.

In January 1663 Philibert, chevalier de Gramont arrived in London. Gramont had been exiled by Louis XIV as he had courted Mademoiselle Anne-Lucie de la Mothe-Houdancourt, on whom the King had set his eyes. Gramont was welcome at Whitehall as he came from the court of which Whitehall was the imitation. He had no difficulties to integrate as French was the predominant language at the English Restoration court.

At court Hamilton met Elizabeth Wetenhall and fell in love with her, but she was married. He then courted Frances Stewart, called "La Belle Stuart" or the "fair Stuart", a maid of honour of the Queen, Catherine of Braganza. Gramont warned Hamilton about courting the fair Stuart as the King had set his eyes on her. Eventually, he met and courted Frances Jennings, a maid of honour of Anne Hyde, the Duchess of York. Macaulay describes her as "beautiful Fanny Jennings, the loveliest coquette in the brilliant Whitehall of the Restoration."

Marriage and children 
In 1665 Hamilton married Frances Jennings. The King approved of this marriage and granted the couple a pension of £500 per year (about £ in ). His marriage is the sixth of the seven marriages with which end the Memoirs of Count Grammont.

 
George and Frances had six children, but only four (all daughters) are known by name:
 Elizabeth (1667–1724), married in 1685 Richard Parsons, 1st Viscount Rosse as his 3rd wife, and was mother of Richard Parsons, 1st Earl of Rosse
 Frances (died 1751), married Henry Dillon, 8th Viscount Dillon in 1687
 Mary (died 1736), married Nicholas Barnewall, 3rd Viscount Barnewall in 1688
 Henrietta seems to have been younger than the three listed above. Not much more is known about her.

Elizabeth, the eldest, was born in England in 1667 and baptised on 21 March at St Margaret's, Westminster, in an Anglican ceremony. The other two were born in France and were brought up as Catholics. According to the conventions of the time, the eldest, being a Protestant, married a Protestant; the younger two, being Catholics, married Catholics. All three married Irish viscounts and were therefore known as the "three viscountesses".

Lord Beaulieu, who had the portrait of George Hamilton used in this article in his collection of paintings, was one of Elizabeth's grandsons. Her descendance through her two sons went extinct in 1764. However, her second daughter, called Catharine, married in 1705 James Hussey and was by him mother of Edward Hussey-Montagu, 1st Earl Beaulieu.

Later life

Second Anglo-Dutch War 
On 4 March 1665 the Second Anglo-Dutch War (1665–1667) broke out. It seems that Hamilton volunteered in the Royal Navy and participated on 3 June 1665 O.S. in the naval battle of Lowestoft, an English victory.

Second exile 
On 28 September 1667 in an increasingly anti-Catholic political climate, the King felt obliged to dismiss from his Life Guards the Catholics who refused to take the Oath of Supremacy, and among them, Hamilton. The king arranged with Louis XIV that Hamilton would be made the captain-lieutenant of a company of gens d'armes under Louis's direct command as captain. On 1 February 1668 Hamilton left England for France passing by Dover and Ostend. He seems to have been knighted by the King before his departure as he is called Sir for the first time on his passport dated 14 January 1668. Hamilton's gens d'armes were part of Louis's body guard.

His wife followed him to France and converted to the Catholic religion. She stayed in Paris. The War of Devolution 1667/1668 was about to end; France was in peace talks with Spain that would lead to the Treaty of Aix-la-Chapelle on in May 1668. In 1668 Hamilton acquired French nationality.

In 1671 Hamilton raised a regiment in Ireland. Some of the officers engaged in this régiment d'Hamilton would earn fame: Patrick Sarsfield, Justin McCarty, George's younger brothers Anthony and Richard, his cousin Gustavus Hamilton, and Thomas Dongan, who was appointed lieutenant-colonel.

In April 1672 France and England declared war on the Dutch Republic; the former starting the Franco-Dutch War (1672–1678), the latter the Third Anglo-Dutch War. Hamilton would pass the rest of his life fighting for France in that war, eventually being killed in action. The first three years he served under Henri, Viscount of Turenne. In the first year of the war, which the Dutch call the rampjaar (disaster-year), Hamilton's regiment was first employed to garrison Liège but joined Louis's main army after the crossing of the Rhine in June. The regiment participated in the siege of Utrecht, which fell on the 20th. After the Dutch had flooded the land to the north, most of the French troops retreated, but Hamilton's regiment stayed behind with the small army of occupation under Marshal Luxembourg, being stationed at Zutphen in Gelderland to the east of Utrecht. In the summer 1673 he joined Turenne's army.

In February 1674 England and the Netherlands concluded the Treaty of Westminster (1674), which ended the Third Anglo-Dutch War, but the Franco-Dutch war continued. This peace did therefore not affect Hamilton, who served under French command. However, from there on to the Treaties of Nijmegen, which ended the Franco-Dutch war, the English Parliament pushed for measures to forbid the King's subjects to fight in French service. On 8 May 1675 the Parliament forced Charles to make a proclamation demanding the immediate return of all his subjects that had gone into French service since the date of the Treaty of Westminster and forbidding all his subjects to enter that service. This made recruiting for Hamilton's regiment difficult.

On 16 June 1674 Turenne fought the battle of Sinsheim, south of Heidelberg, against the Imperials under Aeneas de Caprara. Hamilton commanded three battalions at that occasion, the two of his own regiment and one from the Monmouth regiment. In July Hamilton's regiment participated in the first ravaging of the Palatinate.

On 4 October he fought the Imperial forces under the Duke von Bournonville at Entzheim in Alsace south of Strasbourg, where Hamilton's Regiment attacked on the right wing. Hamilton and his brother Anthony were wounded.

In March 1675 Hamilton visited England with his younger brothers Anthony and Richard. Hamilton returned to France from England, whereas Anthony and Richard continued to Ireland to recruit as the battles of Sinsheim and Entzheim had left gaps in the ranks of the regiment. The recruits were picked up by French ships at Kinsale in April after a missed appointment at Dingle in March.

George's and Anthony's wounds and the voyage to England caused them to miss Turenne's winter campaign 1674/1675, during which the French marched south and surprised the Imperialists by attacking them in Upper Alsace, leading to Turenne's victory at Turckheim on 5 January 1675.

On 27 July 1675 Hamilton fought at Sasbach, where Turenne was killed. The French retreated, pursued by the imperial army under Raimondo Montecuccoli, resulting in rearguard actions known as the Battle of Altenheim where Hamilton and his Irish excelled. In this battle the French army was commanded by the comte Guy Aldonce de Durfort de Lorges and the marquis de Vaubrun, who was slain in the action. Hamilton and his unit were part of the rearguard under Louis de Boufflers. After Altenheim Louis XIV called in Louis, Grand Condé to take over the command of the Rhine Army.

In January 1676 Hamilton went to Ireland to recruit as Altenheim had taken its toll. The recruiting was tolerated by Essex, the Lord Lieutenant of Ireland on instruction by the King. In February 1676 Hamilton was promoted maréchal de camp (major-general) for his achievements at Altenheim. On 10 March 1676 (N.S.) François-Henri de Montmorency, duc de Luxembourg replaced the Grand Condé, who was old, sick, and tired.

Comte d'Hamilton 
French sources generally call Hamilton not chevalier but comte and once even marquis. The Gazette de France of 26 June 1674 mentions Comte d'Hamilton as one of the French commanders at the Battle of Sinsheim. This might simply reflect the belief held by the French that he was a nobleman in England, Scotland, or Ireland, or shear cautious politeness from their part. The French genealogist François-Alexandre Aubert de La Chesnaye Des Bois mentions Hamilton as a Scottish noble family that gave rise to a Duc de Châtelleraut and mentions Comte Antoine Hamilton but not George Hamilton.

Many English sources also call him count. Ó Ciardha says he was made a count in February ennobled by Louis XIV, This might simply echo the French use, taking for truth what is maybe a mistake or politeness. To call George Hamilton the father "the baronet" and his son "the count" is a neat way to distinguish them. Sergeant thinks he was made a count soon after he obtained French nationality. Ó Ciardha seems to believe he was made a count in February 1676 after his achievements at Altenheim.

No source mentions a territorial designation and none mentions that Hamilton owned land that was erected as comté as was done in some other cases.

Death and timeline 
Luxembourg's attempts to relieve the Siege of Philippsburg resulted in many marches and countermarches. Hamilton was killed on 1 June 1676 while commanding Luxembourg's rear-guard at the Col de Saverne (Zebernstieg in Alsatian) where imperial troops under Charles V, Duke of Lorraine pursued the French who were retreating eastward to Saverne in lower Alsace. His younger brother Anthony succeeded him as comte d'Hamilton, but King Charles and his brother the Duke of York insisted that Thomas Dongan should succeed as colonel buying the regiment from the Hamiltons. Despite Luxembourg's efforts Philippsburg fell on the 17 September 1676.

Notes and references

Notes

Citations

Sources 
Subject matter monographs:
Click here. Ó Ciardha in Dictionary of Irish Biography

 
 
  – First American edition, based on the 3rd British one.
 
  – (Snippet view)
 
 
 
 
 
 
 
  – 1643 to 1660
 
 
  – Ab-Adam to Basing (for Barnewall)
  – Dacre to Dysart (for Henry Dillon)
 
 
  – 1675 to 1676
  – 1677 to 1678 (for daughter Henrietta)
  – England
  – Scotland and Ireland
  – 1665 to 1706
 
  – (for timeline)
 
 
  – Princeps (for Houdancourt)
  – (for English quotes)
  – (for his portrait)
 
  – ABA to BAR (for Avaux)
  – GAB to HAZ (for Hamilton)
  – Viscounts (for Butler, Viscount Mountgarret, and Hamilton, Viscount Strabane)
 
 
  – 1689 to 1690
 
 
  
 
 
 
  – D to K
  – Abercorn to Balmerino
  – 1 October 1666 to 30 June 1667

  – 1643 to 1681
  
 
 
 
 
  – 1643 to 1660 and index

External links 

 The lost Settlement of Dunnalong
 Portrait of Sir George Hamilton at the National Portrait Gallery (NPG 1468), London. Oil on canvas, unknown painter, c. 1670
 Miniature portrait of Frances Jennings, by Samuel Cooper, c. 1665
 Print of the engraving of the portrait at the British Museum

1676 deaths
British Life Guards officers
French generals
French military personnel killed in action
French military personnel of the Franco-Dutch War
Wild Geese (soldiers)
Younger sons of baronets